"When All Is Said and Done" is a song recorded in 1981 by Swedish pop group ABBA, and is featured on the group's eighth studio album, The Visitors. The track – with lead vocals by Anni-Frid Lyngstad – was released as a single in the United States (with the non-album track "Should I Laugh or Cry" as the B-side) on 31 December 1981 on Atlantic 3889, and reached No. 27 on the US Billboard Hot 100 in March 1982.

Overview
ABBA consisted of two married couples who later divorced. Similar to the group's 1980 track, "The Winner Takes It All", which could have been influenced by the split between band members Björn Ulvaeus and Agnetha Fältskog, "When All Is Said and Done" detailed the divorce between Anni-Frid Lyngstad and Benny Andersson.

Written during a time of emotional turmoil, Ulvaeus has admitted that the split between Benny and Frida was at the back of his mind during the songwriting process for "When All Is Said and Done". He sought approval from Benny and Frida before the group began working with the song. When recording began in March 1981, only one month had passed since their separation.

"When All Is Said and Done" saw Frida giving words and emotions detailing all of her sorrow and pain, not only for herself, but for all of those who had been through a separation. The backing track the group had first recorded was completely changed after Frida had laid down her powerful and emotional vocals. As Frida herself later recalled: "All my sadness was captured in that song."

ABBA also recorded a Spanish version of "When All Is Said and Done" (entitled "No Hay a Quien Culpar"), which was released as a single in Mexico and several South American countries. The Spanish title written by Buddy and Mary McCluskey translates as "There Is No One to Blame". The track was also slightly remixed, for example leaving out the double-tracked snare drum of the original English version and adding new synth overdubs, giving the song a warmer feeling than the original version. The Spanish interpretation reached No. 29 in Mexico.

Music video
In August 1981, a music video was filmed to promote the song, directed by Lasse Hallström. Parts of the video that feature Lyngstad by the sea were filmed in the Stockholm archipelago. The scenes where the other ABBA members appear were filmed in Stockholm. ABBA also filmed a video for "No Hay a Quien Culpar", the Spanish version of the song, in October 1981. This interpretation is an almost exact copy of the English version, the only difference being Frida's new hairstyle. As a result, with parts of the English version of the video being featured in the Spanish clip, "No Hay a Quien Culpar" includes both of Frida's different hairstyles.

Reception
Although most countries released the track "One of Us" as the first single from The Visitors in December 1981, ABBA's American record label, Atlantic Records, instead opted for "When All Is Said and Done". It was a modest hit for the group in the US, peaking at No. 27 on the Billboard Hot 100; ABBA's 14th and final US Top 40 hit to date.

The track reached No. 10 on the Adult Contemporary chart, giving the group their eighth and final Top 10 hit, and also charted on the Billboard Dance/Disco chart, reaching No. 8.

"When All Is Said and Done" also achieved particular success in Canada, peaking at No. 4 on the Adult Contemporary chart in March 1982 (and spending nine weeks on the chart).

"When All is Said and Done" was also released as a single in Australia (with the album track "Soldiers" as the B-side). A minor hit there, the song peaked at No. 81.

Billboard called it a "melodic, uptempo track" that has "pretty harmonies and a keen sense of accessible yet polished pop textures."

Charts

Mamma Mia!
"When All Is Said and Done" was included in the 2008 film version of the ABBA musical, Mamma Mia!, performed by Sam Carmichael (played by Pierce Brosnan), with one line – "slightly worn but dignified, and not too old for sex" – also sung by Meryl Streep. The song is substantially different from the original release, not only in that it has been reworked into a ballad but also that a new second verse was written by Björn Ulvaeus specifically for the movie soundtrack and added to the song's original lyrics as recorded by ABBA:

"It's been there in my dreams, the scene I see unfold
True at last, flesh and blood, to cherish and to hold
Careless fools will suffer, yes, I know and I confess:
Once I lost my way when something good had just begun
Lesson learned – it's history – when all is said and done"

In the context of the movie, the lyrics also take on an entirely different meaning: as opposed to the original which describes a couple going their separate ways, it portrays two lovers finding their way back to each other and rekindling their romance. The song is sung when Sam decides to propose to Donna after he confesses to marrying another woman and then divorcing her; Donna ultimately accepts.

Cover versions
In 1996, British singer Hazell Dean recorded a dance-oriented cover of "When All Is Said and Done" for her album The Winner Takes It All: Hazell Dean Sings Abba.
A soft vocal cover version of the song can be found on the 2004 ABBA tribute album Funky ABBA by Swedish musician Nils Landgren. This version features Benny Andersson on piano and vocals by Swedish jazz singer Viktoria Tolstoy.
In 2006, Swedish opera singer Anne Sofie von Otter covered the song on her ABBA tribute album I Let the Music Speak.
A eurodance version by DJ Ensamble was featured on the 2006 tribute album Trancing Queen. It is also included on the compilation V.A. Remixland Summer 2007.
In 2007, The Idea of North performed an a cappella version of the song on their Live at the Powerhouse CD and DVD.
In 2018, Norwegian jazz artist Inger Marie Gundersen covered the song on her album Feels Like Home.

References

1981 singles
ABBA songs
Atlantic Records singles
Songs written by Benny Andersson and Björn Ulvaeus
Music videos directed by Lasse Hallström
1981 songs
Songs about divorce